Clavulina gigartinoides is a species of coral fungus in the family Clavulinaceae. Found in Malaysia, it was described by British botanist E.J.H. Corner in 1950.

References

External links

Fungi described in 1950
Fungi of Asia
gigartinoides